The Royal Guardsmen are an American rock band, best known for their 1966 hit singles "Snoopy vs. the Red Baron", "The Return of The Red Baron", "Snoopy For President", and the Christmas follow up "Snoopy's Christmas".

History 
Originally known as the Posmen, the Ocala, Florida-based sextet adopted their anglophile moniker during the British Invasion, led by The Beatles and other British artists. The group was originally composed of Bill Balough (bass), John Burdett (drums), Chris Nunley (vocals), Tom Richards (guitar), Billy Taylor (organ), and Barry Winslow (lead vocals/guitar). The band was managed by Leonard Stogel and Associates.

Although the Guardsmen's first single, "Baby Let's Wait", failed to reach national success, this tune reached a position of no lower than #11 according to the November 12, 1966 WYND hit parade. The group's second offering, "Snoopy vs. the Red Baron", reached #2 in the Billboard Hot 100, remained in the bestsellers for 12 weeks, and was certified gold by the RIAA in February 1967.

Since the band did not ask Peanuts creator Charles M. Schulz for permission, the Canadian arm of Laurie Records refused to issue the single until the legal problems were ironed out: instead, the band recorded the thinly-disguised "Squeaky vs. the Black Knight", which was released in Canada and became a hit on at least one Canadian station. Eventually, Schulz gave his okay, and "Snoopy vs. the Red Baron" was released in Canada.

Immediately the song became a hit, the band went on a national tour during Christmas school break, playing in New York, San Francisco, and other large cities and sharing billing with the Beach Boys, Jefferson Airplane, Paul Revere & the Raiders, The Turtles, The Who, and The Monkees. That summer they toured as opening act for Tommy James & the Shondells and Sam the Sham & the Pharaohs.

Snoopy, the Red Baron, and aircraft became recurring themes in their music, though they did have the top 100 singles "Any Wednesday", "I Say Love", and (at #35) "Baby Let's Wait", a re-release of their first single. Still, some members felt typecast as the Snoopy band and the original group split up in 1970, although a band with some replacement players continued for another year. 

In 1976, the original members (except for organist Taylor) got back together and played club dates for another three years before disbanding again. Guitarist Richards died later that year at age 30, of a brain tumor. The band (including Taylor, and with local guitarist Pat Waddell substituting for Richards) next reunited for a live show on October 2, 2004, at the 50th reunion of their high school marching band, after which the band played a few other shows in 2005. They performed together in 2010; their next live performance after that was 2018.

In December 2006, they released a new Snoopy song, "Snoopy vs. Osama", and in 2011 the single "Alive and Well".

Original members Chris Nunley and Bill Balough and replacement member Pat Waddell continued playing together at least into 2021, in The Crossfire Band of Ocala.

Discography

Albums
 Snoopy vs. the Red Baron (1966) #44
 Return of the Red Baron (1967)
 Snoopy and His Friends (1967) #46
 Also on Billboard's Christmas Album chart at #6 in 1967 and #19 in 1968
 Snoopy for President (1968, re-released 1976) #189 in 1968, in 1976
 Merry Snoopy's Christmas (1978, 1980, 1982, 1984)
 Anthology (CD, April 1995)
 Best of the Royal Guardsmen (CD, May 1998)
 Snoopy vs. the Red Baron / Snoopy and His Friends (CD re-release, June 2001)
 Return of the Red Baron / Snoopy for President (CD re-release, June 2001)

Singles

A Charted 3 times in the US – 1967, 1968, and 1969 reaching #1, #15, and #11 respectively but only on Billboard's "Best Bets For Christmas" chart.
B Original version contains intro mentioning real 1968 candidates; 1972 and 1976 re-issues omit this.
C Only the 'B' side "Biplane Evermore" charted in Australia. Some versions released elsewhere contain "So Right (To Be in Love)" as the 'B' side.
D Barry Winslow solo, but features on some of the Royal Guardsmen's compilation albums.

References

External links

 "Curse You Red Baron: The True Story of The Royal Guardsmen" – By ED Tucker
 Classic Bands: Biography of "The Royal Guardsmen"

Rock music groups from Florida
Musicians from Ocala, Florida
American pop rock music groups
Peanuts music
Musical groups established in 1966
Laurie Records artists
1966 establishments in Florida